The Military Secretary to the Commandant of the Marine Corps is the senior advisor and task manager for the Commandant of the Marine Corps. Personally selected by the Commandant, the Military Secretary is an active duty colonel who reports directly to the Commandant. The exact duties of the Military Secretary have varied based on the needs and preferences of each Commandant. There are no existing manuals or orders that dictate the exact role of the Military Secretary. They run the day-to-day operations of the Office of the Commandant, supervises the schedule of the Commandant, and performs other duties as the Commandant may direct. In order to perform the multi-faceted duties of the Military Secretary, the Marine must be well versed in all aspects of the United States Marine Corps, the United States Department of Defense, and the United States Government.

Comparable positions in other branches of the military are:
U.S. Air Force – Senior Military Assistant
U.S. Army – Executive Officer to the Secretary of the Army
U.S. Navy – Military Assistant

Responsibilities
The Military Secretary serves as a direct advisor to the Commandant of the Marine Corps. The Military Secretary is primarily responsible for filtering and directing the flow of information to the Commandant, keeping the Commandant abreast of situations impacting the Marine Corps, gathering and analyzing pertinent information in order to provide sound guidance and counsel to the Commandant. Their responsibilities extend to acting as a liaison between the Commandant and the Secretary of the General Staff, participating in scheduling and coordination with the Assistant Commandant, and supervising the Commandant's personal staff. Foreign dignitaries often visit the Commandant who in turn travels overseas to visit them. Not only does the Military Secretary oversee the preparation and execution of these trips, they may be required to accompany the Commandant on these trips or engage guests on the Commandant's behalf and they only follow orders from the commandant.

History
Originally, the position of Military Secretary to the Commandant of the Marine Corps (or MilSec) was called the Secretary to the Major General Commandant (MGC). The position was created by the 17th Commandant of the Marine Corps, Major General Thomas Holcomb, who appointed Colonel Alexander A. Vandegrift as the first Military Secretary in 1936.

Until the 1950s, the Assistant Commandant worked in the same office as the Commandant. At this time the Assistant Commandant moved to his own office space and created a more defined position. Prior to this move, the Military Secretary performed duties for the Assistant Commandant as well.

List of military secretaries
Fifty-three Marines have served as the Military Secretary to the Commandant of the Marine Corps.  Two Marines have served as the Military Secretary and have later gone on to become the Commandant:
General Alexander A. Vandegrift
General James L. Jones, Jr.

The current Military Secretary is Colonel Robert Weiler.

See also
Commandant of the Marine Corps
Assistant Commandant of the Marine Corps
Sergeant Major of the Marine Corps

References

External links
 Official Home of the United States Marine Corps
 General James F. Amos, Commandant of the Marine Corps

United States Marine Corps leadership
1936 establishments in the United States